General Pike may refer to:

Albert Pike (1809–1891), Confederate States Army brigadier general
Hew Pike (born 1943), British Army lieutenant general
William Pike (British Army officer) (1905–1993), British Army lieutenant general
Zebulon Pike (1779–1813), U.S. Army brigadier general